Luke Stauffacher (born December 17, 1980 in Madison, Wisconsin) is an American professional ice hockey player, currently playing for the Odessa Jackalopes of the Central Hockey League.

Playing career
He began his junior career playing for the Green Bay Gamblers in the USHL.  During his time in Green Bay, Stauffacher was a regular first team player, featuring in 189 games and scoring 116 points over a four-year spell.

Stauffacher went on to play at University level, icing for the University of Minnesota - Duluth at NCAA level.  Stauffacher spent four years in Minnesota, and was again a regular first team player and a reliable player in terms of both goals and assists.  During the 2004–05 season, Stauffacher was signed by the Peoria Rivermen of the ECHL, but only played two games.

The following season he moved to another ECHL team, the Charlotte Checkers.  Stauffacher appeared in over 50 games for the Checkers, grabbing 20 points along the way.  Late in the season he again switched teams to play for the Trenton Titans, for whom he also made two post-season appearances.
Stauffacher would again move during the off season, this time to link up with the UHL Quad City Mallards.  At the lower level, Stauffacher would flourish, totalling almost a point a game during a 76-game regular season stint.

Due to his points production, Stauffacher would move back to the ECHL for the start of the 2007–08 season, but would only manage five appearances before moving to sign for the Manchester Phoenix mid-season, where he played alongside former Quad City Mallards line-mate Sean Starke. In 43 appearances for the Phoenix, Stauffacher managed to score 16 goals and help out with 28 assists, a ratio of just over a point per game.  Despite this he was not re-signed by the Phoenix and moved back to his native North America and signed for the Muskegon Lumberjacks of the International Hockey League.

A free agent for the 2009–10 season, Stauffacher joined the Tulsa Oilers mid-year for the duration of the season on February 23, 2010.

Career stats

References

External links

1980 births
American men's ice hockey right wingers
Charlotte Checkers (1993–2010) players
Fresno Falcons players
Green Bay Gamblers players
Ice hockey players from Wisconsin
Living people
Manchester Phoenix players
Minnesota Duluth Bulldogs men's ice hockey players
Muskegon Lumberjacks players
Odessa Jackalopes players
Sportspeople from Madison, Wisconsin
Peoria Rivermen (ECHL) players
Quad City Mallards (UHL) players
Trenton Titans players
Tulsa Oilers (1992–present) players